Convergence for the Development of Mali (CODEM) is a political party in Mali. Its emblem is a distaff and its slogan is "Let's count on our own strengths first" (Comptons d’abord sur nos propres forces).

History
The party was established on 23 May 2008 by five MPs; Alassane Abba, Housseini Guindo, Marie Sylla, Saran Sinaté and Souleymane Guindo.

In the 2013 parliamentary elections it won  five seats, becoming the fifth largest party in the National Assembly.

References

External links
 Official website

Political parties in Mali
Political parties established in 2008